"Disarm" is the name of a song by American alternative rock band The Smashing Pumpkins.

Disarm may also refer to:
Disarm (film), a 2005 documentary film about landmines
Disarm (band), a Swedish hardcore punk band
Disarm (Ukrainian band), a Ukrainian band from Lviv
The process of disarmament in which a force, or organization no longer is armed.

See also
Disarmament